December Songs is a song cycle by Maury Yeston, best known as the musical theatre composer-lyricist responsible for the music and lyrics of Nine, Titanic, Phantom, Death Takes a Holiday, and part of Grand Hotel. The work is a "retelling" of Franz Schubert's Winterreise, (a song cycle of art songs), with a cabaret sensibility. The songs in both December Songs and Winterreise are linked as a sequence of reflections by the singer taking a lonely walk in winter, thinking back on his or her lost love. The piece crosses over the line from classical music to Broadway to cabaret. Where the Schubert masterpiece features words by Wilhelm Müller portraying a jilted young man's wandering the snows of the Vienna woods and ultimately sinking into madness, the Yeston lyrics depict a contemporary young woman wandering a snowy Central Park in New York City and finding recovery and hope on her journey. December Songs pictures in richly varied melodies and striking yet unforced poetic images a worldly young woman, jilted and adrift in a wintry New York City, reading all she sees for commentary on her broken heart.  Recorded six times in English, and once each in French, German, and Polish.

One of the dozen or so Carnegie Hall centennial commissions, Weill Recital Hall was packed with Broadway and nightclub luminaries, who gave it a thunderous ovation. The New York Times indicated the uniqueness of the score as Yeston's confident marriage of the classic and the contemporaneity that would likely lead to its enduring nature."

The work was written as a result of Yeston being commissioned to write a piece for the 1991 centennial celebration of New York's Carnegie Hall, where it was performed by cabaret singer Andrea Marcovicci.  It was then performed for three months in 2004 at the Theatre du Renard in Paris, where it was sung in French by Isabelle Georges.  It has been recorded seven times in English by Marcovicci, Georges, Harolyn Blackwell, and others, in German by Pia Douwes, with a German translation by Wolfgang Adenberg, in Polish by Edyta Krzemien, also in English (in the Netherlands) by Hetty Sponselee and Sheila Conolly, and in French by Georges. Two time Tony nominee Laura Osnes recently featured December Songs in her 54 Below debut, Laura Osnes Sings Maury Yeston, and on her album If I Tell You. December Songs was recorded with a male singer for the first time in 2017 by New York cabaret singer Stearns Matthews. In 2022, a new recording, December Songs for Voice and Orchestra featured Victoria Clark as soloist with orchestrations by Larry Hochman.

December Songs has been performed worldwide including France, the UK, Germany, the Netherlands, and Poland,

Song list 
 "December Snow"
 "Where Are You Now"
 "Please Let's Not Even Say Hello"
 "When Your Love Is New"
 "Bookseller In The Rain"
 "My Grandmother's Love Letters"
 "I Am Longing"
 "I Had A Dream About You"
 "By The River"
 "What A Relief"

References

External links
 Maury Yeston's December Songs page 
 Stearns Matthews' December Songs page
 Yeston nous parle de december songs

Compositions by Maury Yeston
1991 compositions
Song cycles